Ictalurus mexicanus, the Rio Verde catfish, is a species of North American freshwater catfish, endemic to the Pánuco River basin (notably Rio Verde) in Mexico.

References

 

Ictalurus
Freshwater fish of Mexico
Fish described in 1904
Taxonomy articles created by Polbot